Mohan Krishna Akshaya (born October 14, 1990) is an Indian cricketer from Kasargod who plays domestic cricket for Kerala. He is a right handed batsman and right arm offspinner. He has also played for Manglore United in Karnataka Premier League.

References

Indian cricketers
Kerala cricketers
1990 births
Living people